Irreligion in Italy includes all citizens of Italy that are atheist, agnostic, or otherwise irreligious. Approximately 12% of Italians are irreligious, and no affiliation is the second most common religious demographic in Italy after Christianity. Freedom of religion in Italy was guaranteed by the Constitution of Italy following its enactment in 1948. Until then, the Catholic Church was the official state church of Italy.

History 
The earliest recorded accounts of atheism in Italy was in the 1550s. 15th century Italy was prominently written about as a breeding ground for Atheism. During the Italian Renaissance, Italy became a major hub of early secular philosophy.

In a letter to John Calvin, Italian theologian Lelio Sozzini wrote:

"Most of my friends are so well educated they can scarcely believe God exists."

Roger Ascham in 1551 wrote about his experience in Italy:

"a man may freelie discourse against what he will, against whom he lust: against any Prince, agaynst any gouernement, yea against God him selfe, and his whole Religion" 

Gui Patin in the 17th century described Italy in reference to religion as the land of:

"Pox, poisoning, and atheism"

Lucilio Vanini represented an early voice in Italian secularism. Vanini became a Carmelite Friar in 1603. Vanini sought refuge secretly with the English ambassador to Venice in 1612. While in England, he publicly renounced Catholicism with the writing of two books about naturalistic philosophy. Vanini's idea of naturalistic philosophy was that the world is eternal and governed by imminent laws. In this time, Vanini wrote two books: Aversus veteres philosophos in 1615, and De Admirandis Naturae Reginae Deaeque Mortalium Arcanis in 1616. The ideas in Vanini's books caused controversy in Italy with the Catholic Church and he was accused of atheism. For the accusation of atheism, he was condemned. In 1619, known under the pseudonym, Pompeo Uciglio, he was savagely executed in Toulouse. The Venetian Holy Inquisition sought to challenge irreligion during this time.

Other irreligious Italian philosophers such as Giuseppe Rensi were critical of religion later in the 20th century.

Prominent Italian Irreligious Historical Figures

Politicians and Artists 

 Benito Mussolini- Former prime minister of Italy and leader of the National Fascist Party
 Giacomo Manzù- Created the doors of St. Peter's Basilica in Vatican City
 Giuliano Ferrara- Italian politician

All Notable Figures 

 Italy has had many notable figures that identify or have identified as atheist or irreligious. 
 For full list see main article: Italian atheists

Current Demographics 
11.5–13% of the population in Italy are religiously unaffiliated. The Global Religious Futures project predicts this number to grow to 16.3% by 2050, despite the unaffiliated group having slightly lower fertility rate than the religious ones. Using a less direct definition, the WIN/GIA Global Index of Religiosity and Atheism survey found that 23% of the population was "not a religious person" in 2012, which grew to 26% by 2017. About 96% of all Italians are baptized into the Catholic Church which impacts births, marriage, and funerals. Importance of religion has declined among the younger generation of Italians in the 21st century.

See also 

 Demographics of Italy
 Religion in Italy
 Catholic Church
 Atheism
 Union of Rationalist Atheists and Agnostics

References

 
Religion in Italy
Italy